Events in the year 1907 in Germany.

Incumbents

National level
 Kaiser – Wilhelm II
 Chancellor – Bernhard von Bülow

State level

Kingdoms
 King of Bavaria – Otto of Bavaria
 King of Prussia – Kaiser Wilhelm II
 King of Saxony – Frederick Augustus III of Saxony
 King of Württemberg – William II of Württemberg

Grand Duchies
 Grand Duke of Baden – Frederick I then Frederick II
 Grand Duke of Hesse – Ernest Louis
 Grand Duke of Mecklenburg-Schwerin – Frederick Francis IV
 Grand Duke of Mecklenburg-Strelitz – Adolphus Frederick V
 Grand Duke of Oldenburg – Frederick Augustus II
 Grand Duke of Saxe-Weimar-Eisenach – William Ernest

Principalities
 Schaumburg-Lippe – George, Prince of Schaumburg-Lippe
 Schwarzburg-Rudolstadt – Günther Victor, Prince of Schwarzburg-Rudolstadt
 Schwarzburg-Sondershausen – Karl Günther, Prince of Schwarzburg-Sondershausen
 Principality of Lippe – Leopold IV, Prince of Lippe
 Reuss Elder Line – Heinrich XXIV, Prince Reuss of Greiz (with Heinrich XIV, Prince Reuss Younger Line as regent)
 Reuss Younger Line – Heinrich XIV, Prince Reuss Younger Line
 Waldeck and Pyrmont – Friedrich, Prince of Waldeck and Pyrmont

Duchies
 Duke of Anhalt – Frederick II, Duke of Anhalt
 Duke of Brunswick – vacant to 28 May, then Duke John Albert of Mecklenburg (regent)
 Duke of Saxe-Altenburg – Ernst I, Duke of Saxe-Altenburg
 Duke of Saxe-Coburg and Gotha – Charles Edward, Duke of Saxe-Coburg and Gotha
 Duke of Saxe-Meiningen – Georg II, Duke of Saxe-Meiningen

Colonial Governors
 Cameroon (Kamerun) – Otto Gleim (acting governor) (2nd term) to 1 July, then Theodor Seitz (3rd term)
 Kiaochow (Kiautschou) – Oskar von Truppel
 German East Africa (Deutsch-Ostafrika) – Georg Albrecht Freiherr von Rechenberg
 German New Guinea (Deutsch-Neuguinea) – Albert Hahl (2nd term)
 German Samoa (Deutsch-Samoa) – Wilhelm Solf
 German South-West Africa (Deutsch-Südwestafrika) – Friedrich von Lindequist to 20 May, then Bruno von Schuckmann
 Togoland – Johann Nepomuk Graf Zech auf Neuhofen

Events
 25 January – The 'Hottentot election', so called because of the nationalist atmosphere whipped up during the campaign, sees the Social Democratic Party of Germany gain half a million votes and yet lose half of their seats.
 May – A separate Imperial Colonial Office is set up distinct from the Auswärtiges Amt.
 15 July – An experimental train is reported to reach 81 mph and reach 98 mph maximum
 6 October – The Deutscher Werkbund is established in Munich.
 The Herero and Namaqua Genocide reaches its climax in this year.

Undated
 Arsphenamine is first synthesised in 1907 in Paul Ehrlich's lab by Alfred Bertheim.

Architecture
 Kaiser-Wilhelm-Brücke, a swing bridge is opened in Wilhelmshaven.

Arts
 Oscar Straus's opera Ein Walzertraum receives its premiere.

Diplomacy
 18 October – Germany is among the signatories of the Hague Convention of 1907.

Education
 The University of Mannheim is established.

Science
 Eduard Buchner is awarded the Nobel Prize in Chemistry.

Sport
 May – 1907 World Wrestling Championships held in Frankfurt
 13–14 June – 1907 Kaiser Preis motor race is held.
 Freiburger FC are crowned German football champions for the first time.
 The Rund um die Hainleite cycling race in Erfurt is held for the first time.

Transport
 5 October – The SMS Dresden is launched.

Births

 4 January – Willy Busch, footballer (died 1982)
 16 January – Martin Scherber, composer (died 1974)
 20 January – Manfred von Ardenne, physicist (died 1997)
 25 January – Helmut Weiss, film director (died 1969)
 1 February – Günter Eich, author (died 1972)
 7 February – Kurt Hasse, equestrian (died 1944)
 19 February – Rudolf von Beckerath, organ builder (died 1976)
 23 February – Hans-Jürgen von Blumenthal, German resistance member (died 1944)
 11 March:
 Heinz Brandt, equestrian and officer (died 1944)
 Helmuth James Graf von Moltke, jurist (died 1945)
 Konrad Wolff, musicologist (died 1989)
 12 March – Josef Stangl, Bishop of Würzburg (died 1979)
 13 March – Ludwig Biermann, astronomer (died 1986)
 17 March – Franz Kartz, boxer
 20 March – Helmut Echternach, theologian (died 1988)
 24 March – Josef Lanzendörfer, bobsledder
 30 March:
 Friedrich August Freiherr von der Heydte, Luftwaffe officer (died 1994)
 Rudolf Krause, racing driver (died 1987)
 7 April – Friedrich Wegener, pathologist (died 1990)
 8 April – Walter Leinweber, ice hockey player (died 1997)
 16 April – August Eigruber , Nazi Gauleiter (died 1947)
 30 April – Karl-Lothar Schulz, General (died 1972)
 8 May – Wolf Graf von Baudissin, General (died 1993)
 9 May – Baldur von Schirach, head of the Hitler Youth (died 1974)
 11 May:
 Hermann Behrends, Schutzstaffel officer (died 1948)
 Eva Schulze-Knabe, painter (died 1976)
 14 May – Hans von der Groeben, diplomat (died 2005)
 17 May – Ulrich Biel, CDU politician (died 1996)
 22 May – Werner Müller, ethnologist (died 1990)
 27 May
 Alois Kratzer, ski jumper (died 1990)
 Herbert Seifert, mathematician (died 1996)
 2 June – Willy Langkeit, general (died 1996)
 6 June – Ernst Gaber, rower (died 1975)
 7 June – Hilarius Breitinger, Franciscan (died 1974)
 14 June – Paul Klinger, actor (died 1971)
 22 June – Eberhard Koebel, German youth leader and writer (died 1955)
 25 June:
 J. Hans D. Jensen, nuclear physicist (died 1973)
 Hugo Strauß, rower (died 1941)
 26 June – Friedrich Asinger, chemist (died 1999)
 1 July – Fabian von Schlabrendorff, jurist and German resistance member (died 1980)
 2 July – Ernst Kupfer, Luftwaffe officer (died 1943)
 7 July – Walter Dieminger, space scientist (died 2000)
 8 July – Otto Kranzbühler, judge (died 2004)
 11 July – Adalbert von Blanc, Kriegsmarine officer (died 1976)
 17 July – Winfried Mahraun, diver (died 1973)
 13 August – Alfried Krupp von Bohlen und Halbach, industrialist (died 1967)
 30 August – Hans Georg Rupp, judge (died 1989)
 6 September – Ilse Schwidetzky, anthropologist (died 1997)
 9 September – Joachim Sadrozinski, officer (died 1944)
 10 September – Dorothea von Salviati, member of the royal family (died 1972)
 15 September – Alfred Delp, priest and philosopher (died 1945)
 18 September – Jakob Brendel, wrestler (died 1964)
 19 September – Heinrich Trettner, general (died 2006)
 20 September – Nicolaus von Below, adjutant to Adolf Hitler (died 1983)
 22 September – Hermann Schlichting, engineer (died 1982)
 23 September – Herbert Kappler, police chief (died 1978)
 25 September – Otto Weiß, Luftwaffe officer (died 1955)
 29 September – Helmut Lemke, CDU politician (died 1990)
 9 October – Horst Wessel, Nazi Party activist (died 1930)
 12 October – Wolfgang Fortner, composer (died 1987)
 17 October – Herbert Böhme, poet (died 1971)
 19 October – Paul Klingenburg, water polo player (died 1964)
 22 October:
 Emilie Schindler, humanitarian (died 2001)
 Günther Treptow, opera singer (died 1981)
 24 October – Albert Hoffmann, Nazi Gauleiter (died 1972)
 9 November – Louis Ferdinand, Prince of Prussia, son of Kaiser Wilhelm II (died 1994)
 10 November – Hans Herbert Fiedler, opera singer (died 2004)
 15 November – Claus von Stauffenberg, German resistance member and leader of the 20 July plot (died 1944)
 22 November – Gustav Adolf Scheel, physician (died 1979)
 24 November – Friedrich Geiger, car designer (died 1996)
 30 November – Anton Biersack, composer (died 1982)
 9 December – Max Deuring, mathematician (died 1984)
 12 December – Ilse Fürstenberg, actress (died 1976)
 13 December – Theodor Wisch, SS commander (died 1995)
 16 December – Hanns Scharff, interrogator (died 1992)
 20 December – Leny Marenbach, actress (died 1984)
 23 December – Georg Haentzschel, pianist (died 1992)
 27 December:
 Sebastian Haffner, journalist (died 1999)
 Johann Trollmann, boxer (died 1943)
 28 December
 Franz Ehrlich, architect (died 1984)
 Erich Mielke, politician (died 2000)
 Heinz Förstendorf, field hockey player (died 1988)
 31 December – Walter Huppenkothen, lawyer (died 1978)

Deaths

 9 January – Marie of Saxe-Altenburg, Queen of Hanover (born 1818)
 30 January – Ludwig Woltmann, German zoologist (born 1871)
 5 February – Ludwig Thuille, composer (born 1861)
 8 February – Alfred Kirchhoff, German geographer (born 1838)
 14 February – Adolf Seel, painter (born 1829)
 17 February – Wilhelm von Bezold, physicist (born 1837)
 24 February – Otto Goldschmidt, composer (born 1829)
 6 March – Karl Heinrich von Boetticher, FKP politician (born 1833)
 13 March – Fritz Scheel, conductor (born 1852)
 20 March – Ottomar Rosenbach, physician (born 1851)
 25 March – Ernst von Bergmann, surgeon (born 1836)
 1 April – Johann Friedrich Jaennicke, entomologist (born 1831)
 30 April – Julius Langbehn, art historian (born 1851)
 3 May – Hermann Tietz, merchant (born 1837)
 13 May – Prince Moritz of Saxe-Altenburg, nobleman (born 1829)
 30 May – Ottomar Anschütz, inventor (born 1846)
 5 July – Kuno Fischer, philosopher (born 1824)
 13 July – Heinrich Kreutz, astronomer (born 1854)
 10 August – Hermann Ende architect (born 1829)
 13 August – Hermann Carl Vogel, astronomer (born 1841)
 13 September – Jacob Friedrich Behrend, jurist (born 1833)
 28 September – Frederick I, Grand Duke of Baden, nobleman (born 1826)
 3 October – Alfred Reisenauer, pianist (born 1863)
 10 October – Adolf Furtwängler, archaeologist (born 1853)
 12 November – Prince Arnulf of Bavaria, nobleman and General (born 1852)
 16 November – Gustav Hertzberg, historian (born 1826)
 21 November – Paula Modersohn-Becker, painter (born 1876)
 25 November – Heinrich Dernburg, jurist (born 1829)
 30 November – Ludwig Levy, German architect (born 1854)
 21 December – Klara Hitler, mother of Adolf Hitler (born 1860)

References

 
Years of the 20th century in Germany
Germany
Germany